Astrolabe Glacier is a glacier  wide and  long, flowing north-northeast from the continental ice and terminating at the coast in a prominent tongue at the east side of Geologie Archipelago. It was first sighted in 1840 by the French expedition under Captain Jules Dumont d'Urville, although no glaciers were noted on d'Urville's chart of this coast but a formidable icy dike with perpendicular flanks of 37.7 m high according to the joined plate, corresponding to the glacier tongue. The glacier was photographed from the air by U.S. Navy Operation Highjump in January 1947. It was charted by the French Antarctic Expedition, 1949–51, and named after d'Urville's flagship, the Astrolabe.

See also
 List of glaciers in the Antarctic
 Glaciology

References

Footnotes

Glaciers of Adélie Land